Cattleya labiata, also known as the crimson cattleya or ruby-lipped cattleya, is the type species of Cattleya, discovered in 1818 in Brazil.

This plant grows in the northeastern area of Brazil, in the states of Pernambuco and Alagoas. They grow to different sizes depending on the area from which they originate. Those that are growing in Pernambuco are smaller, with small but colored flowers, with most of them being lilac. The interior part of the flower is a dark lilac color. Plants from Alagoas are bigger and have larger flowers. Some varieties, such as Cattleya labiata var. semialba, have large white flowers with a touch of yellow. There is another variety of semialba, with lilac in the inferior part of the flower. This plant is an epiphyte, growing up in trees, where light is plentiful. However, there are also many other places where this plant could grow, such as directly on rock with very little soil.

The plant itself is a medium-sized unifoliate (labiate) Cattleya, with a medium-sized rhizome. The plant has long leaves, with a tough (coriaceous) consistency because of the aridity in the canopy of trees, due to a short dry season. For water requirements, the plant has a pseudobulb under every leaf to store water and nutritive substances during the short dry season. In the wet season new leaves grow rapidly, producing a large flowered inflorescence. Flowers are white or lavender colored with a darker spot in the lip. Pollination is performed by insects, usually by a scent-collecting male euglossine bee. The result is a capsule with a very large number of seeds (10,000-20,000).

The diploid chromosome number of C. labiata has been variously determined as 2n = 40, 41, and 46.  The haploid chromosome number of C. labiata has been variously determined as n = 21 and 21.

References

External links 

labiata
Epiphytic orchids
Endemic orchids of Brazil
Orchids of Pernambuco
Flora of Alagoas
Flora of the Atlantic Forest
labiata